Cully Park is a  public park operated by Portland Parks & Recreation in northeast Portland, Oregon's Cully neighborhood, in the United States. The park was acquired in 2002. The site previously served as a landfill.

Cully Park offers views of Mount Hood and Mount St. Helens.

References

External links

 

Cully, Portland, Oregon
Parks in Portland, Oregon